In organometallic chemistry, transition metal complexes of nitrite describes families of coordination complexes containing one or more nitrite ligands. Although the synthetic derivatives are only of scholarly interest, metal-nitrite complexes occur in several enzymes that participate in the nitrogen cycle.

Structure and bonding

Bonding modes
Three linkage isomers are common for nitrite ligands, O-bonded, N-bonded, and bidentate O,O-bonded. These two forms are sometimes called nitro and nitrito. An example of chelating nitrite is  – "bipy" is the bidentate ligand 2,2′-bipyridyl. This bonding mode is sometimes described as κ2O,O-.

Focusing on electron-counting in monometallic complexes, O-bonded, N-bonded are viewed as 1-electron pseudohalides ("X-ligand"). The bidentate O,O-bonded is an "L-X ligand", akin to bidentate carboxylate.

With respect to HSAB theory, the N bonding mode is more common for softer metal centers. The O and O,O-bidentate modes are hard ligands, being found on Lewis-acidic metal centers.

In its reaction with ferric porphyrin complexes, nitrite gives the O-bonded isomer, . Addition of donor ligands to this complex induces the conversion to the octahedral low-spin isomer, which now is a soft Lewis acid. The nitrite isomerizes to the N-bonded isomer, .

Homoleptic complexes

Several homoleptic (complexes with only one kind of ligand) complexes have been characterized by X-ray crystallography. The inventory includes octahedral complexes  (M = Co, Rh). Square-planar homoleptic complexes are also known for Pt(II) and Pd(II).

Synthesis of nitrito complexes
Traditionally metal nitrito complexes are prepared by salt metathesis or ligand substitution reactions using alkali metal nitrite salts, such as sodium nitrite. At neutral pH, nitrite exists predominantly as the anion, not nitrous acid.

Metal nitrosyl complexes undergo base hydrolysis, yielding nitrite complexes. This pattern is manifested in the behavior of nitroprusside:

Reactions of nitrito complexes
Some anionic nitrito complexes undergo acid-induced deoxygenation to give the nitrosyl complex. 

The reaction is reversible in some cases. Thus, one can generate nitrito complexes by base-hydrolysis of electrophilic metal nitrosyls.

Nitro complexes also catalyze the oxidation of alkenes.

Bioinorganic chemistry
Metal nitrito complexes figure prominently in the nitrogen cycle, which describes the relationships and interconversions of ammonia up to nitrate. Because nitrogen is often a limiting nutrient, this cycle is important. Nitrite itself does not readily undergo redox reactions, but its metal complexes do.

Oxidation to nitrate
The molybdenum-containing enzyme nitrite oxidoreductase catalyzes the oxidation of nitrite to nitrate:

Reduction
The heme-based enzyme nitrite reductase catalyzes the conversion of nitrite to ammonia. The cycle begins with reduction of an iron-nitrite complex to a metal nitrosyl complex.

The copper-containing enzyme nitrite reductase (CuNIR) catalyzes the 1-electron reduction of nitrite to nitric oxide. The proposed mechanism entails the protonation of a κ2O,O-NO2-Cu(I) complex. This protonation induces cleavage of an N–O bond, giving a HO–Cu–ON center, which features a nitric oxide ligand O-bonded to Cu(II) (an isonitrosyl).

References

Ligands
Coordination chemistry
Nitrites